Mangifera dewildei is a species of plant in the family Anacardiaceae. It is endemic to North Sumatra in Indonesia. It is a vulnerable species threatened by habitat loss.

References

dewildei
Endemic flora of Sumatra
Trees of Sumatra
Vulnerable plants
Taxonomy articles created by Polbot
Taxa named by André Joseph Guillaume Henri Kostermans